Michael Robin Christiansen (7 April 1927 – 12 June 1984) was a British newspaper editor.

The son of Arthur Christiansen, editor of the Daily Express, Michael followed his father into journalism.  He worked first at the Daily Mail, then in 1956 became Deputy Subeditor of the Daily Mirror.  He rose to become assistant editor, and in 1962 gave John Pilger his first job in Britain, on the basis that he supposed he would be good at cricket.

In 1963, Christiansen was appointed as editor of the Sunday Mirror, remaining in post until he became deputy editor of the Daily Mirror in 1972, then editor in 1974.  He suffered a stroke the following year, forcing him to retire. In later life, he ran a bookshop in Chelmsford, Essex. He died there on 12 June 1984, at the age of 57.

In 2013 Christiansen's son Rupert published an account of growing up with his father called I Know You're Going to be Happy.

References

1927 births
1984 deaths
British people of Scandinavian descent
Daily Mirror people
English male journalists
English newspaper editors